Gunnar Ekstrand (January 19, 1892 – June 10, 1966) was a Swedish diver who competed in the 1912 Summer Olympics and in the 1920 Summer Olympics.

In 1912 he was eliminated in the first round of the plain high diving competition. Eight years later at the Antwerp Games he finished fifth in the 3 metre springboard event. In the 10 metre platform competition he was eliminated in the first round.

References

1892 births
1966 deaths
Swedish male divers
Olympic divers of Sweden
Divers at the 1912 Summer Olympics
Divers at the 1920 Summer Olympics
Place of birth missing
Place of death missing
20th-century Swedish people